Aegiale or Aegialeia  or Aegialia (Ancient Greek:  or ) was, in Greek mythology, a daughter of Adrastus and Amphithea, or of Aegialeus the son of Adrastus, whence she bears the surname of Adrastine. One account refers to her as Euryaleia.

Mythology 
Aegiale was married to Diomedes, who, on his return from Troy, found her living in adultery with Cometes. According to some sources, Aegiale had multiple lovers, including a certain Hippolytus. Diomedes attributed this misfortune to the anger of Aphrodite, whom he had wounded in the war against Troy, but when Aegiale went so far as to threaten his life, he fled to Italy. According to Dictys Cretensis, Aegiale, like Clytemnestra, had been seduced to her criminal conduct by a treacherous report, that Diomedes was returning with a Trojan woman who lived with him as his wife, and on his arrival at Argos Aegiale expelled him. In Ovid she is described as the type of a bad wife.

Notes

References 

Apollodorus, The Library with an English Translation by Sir James George Frazer, F.B.A., F.R.S. in 2 Volumes, Cambridge, MA, Harvard University Press; London, William Heinemann Ltd. 1921. . Online version at the Perseus Digital Library. Greek text available from the same website.
Bell, Robert E., Women of Classical Mythology: A Biographical Dictionary. ABC-Clio. 1991. .
Dictys Cretensis, from The Trojan War. The Chronicles of Dictys of Crete and Dares the Phrygian translated by Richard McIlwaine Frazer, Jr. (1931-). Indiana University Press. 1966. Online version at the Topos Text Project.
Homer, The Iliad with an English Translation by A.T. Murray, Ph.D. in two volumes. Cambridge, MA., Harvard University Press; London, William Heinemann, Ltd. 1924. Online version at the Perseus Digital Library.
Homer. Homeri Opera in five volumes. Oxford, Oxford University Press. 1920. Greek text available at the Perseus Digital Library.
Publius Ovidius Naso, Ibis translated by A. S. Kline © 2003. Online version at the Poetry in Translation
Publius Ovidius Naso, Ibis. R. Merkelii Recognitione, Vol III. Rudolf Merkel. Rudolf Ehwald. Lipsiae. In Aedibus B.G. Teubneri. 1889. Latin text available at the Perseus Digital Library.
Publius Ovidius Naso, Metamorphoses translated by Brookes More (1859-1942). Boston, Cornhill Publishing Co. 1922. Online version at the Perseus Digital Library.
Publius Ovidius Naso, Metamorphoses. Hugo Magnus. Gotha (Germany). Friedr. Andr. Perthes. 1892. Latin text available at the Perseus Digital Library.

Women in Greek mythology
Argive characters in Greek mythology
Deeds of Aphrodite